Uniontown is a home rule-class city in Union County, Kentucky, United States. The population was 1,002 at the 2010 census.  The John T. Myers Locks and Dam, once known as Uniontown Locks and Dam, is located downriver 3½ miles.

History

The name "Uniontown" derives from the fact that the city was formed by merging the towns of Francisburg and Locust Port in 1840.  A post office with the new name opened in 1842.

The Uniontown levee, built in response to the Ohio River flood of 1937, was completed in 1951.

Geography
Uniontown is located at  (37.772281, -87.931890). The city is situated along the Ohio River, at its confluence with Highland Creek. Kentucky Route 130 and Kentucky Route 360 intersect in downtown Uniontown. KY 130 crosses the levee, connecting the city with the Uniontown Ferry Boat Dock along the river.

Demographics

As of the census of 2000, there were 1,064 people, 445 households, and 300 families residing in the city. The racial makeup of the city was 91.54% White, 7.61% African American, 0.19% Native American, 0.09% Asian, and 0.56% from two or more races. Hispanic or Latino of any race were 0.38% of the population.

There were 445 households, out of which 33.7% had children under the age of 18 living with them, 45.8% were married couples living together, 16.0% had a female householder with no husband present, and 32.4% were non-families. 30.6% of all households were made up of individuals, and 13.9% had someone living alone who was 65 years of age or older. The average household size was 2.39 and the average family size was 2.95.

In the city, the population was spread out, with 26.6% under the age of 18, 9.9% from 18 to 24, 28.9% from 25 to 44, 21.5% from 45 to 64, and 13.1% who were 65 years of age or older. The median age was 35 years. For every 100 females, there were 95.2 males. For every 100 females age 18 and over, there were 89.1 males.

The median income for a household in the city was $26,700, and the median income for a family was $31,146. Males had a median income of $24,408 versus $18,235 for females. The per capita income for the city was $13,258. About 15.3% of families and 18.2% of the population were below the poverty line, including 28.0% of those under age 18 and 15.2% of those age 65 or over.

Education
Uniontown is served by the Union County Public Schools, Kentucky.  Elementary students attend Uniontown Elementary.  Middle and High School students attend Union County Middle School & Union County High School outside Morganfield.

Uniontown has a lending library, a branch of the Union County Public Library.

See also
 List of cities in Kentucky
 List of cities and towns along the Ohio River

References

External links

Cities in Union County, Kentucky
Cities in Kentucky
Kentucky populated places on the Ohio River